The College of Agriculture, Pantnagar, India, is a constituent of Govind Ballabh Pant University of Agriculture & Technology, Pantnagar. It was opened on 17 November 1960 when Jawaharlal Nehru, the first Prime Minister of India, inaugurated the university. It has a triple mandate of teaching, research and extension.

The college has more than 200 faculty members engaged in agricultural sciences. The college has played a role in the Green Revolution in the country. More than 185 varieties of crops like cereals, pulses, oilseeds, forages, fruits and vegetables, etc. have been released. The 4 year Bachelor of Science in Agriculture (BScAg) is the flagship course of the college.

Departments

The college has twelve departments:
Agronomy (ICAR Centre for Advanced Study)
Agricultural communication
Agricultural Economics
Agrometerology
Entomology
Food Science and Technology
Genetics and Plant Breeding
Horticulture
Plant Pathology (ICAR Centre for Advanced Study)
Soil Science
Vegetable Science
Seed Science and Technology

Earlier, the college also included two departments of Animal Nutrition, and Animal Breeding and Genetics, which were subsequently transferred to College of Veterinary and Animal Sciences.

References

Agricultural universities and colleges in India
Agriculture in Uttarakhand
Universities and colleges in Uttarakhand
Education in Udham Singh Nagar district
Pantnagar
Educational institutions established in 1960
1960 establishments in Uttar Pradesh